Ramón "Ramoncito" F. Campos Jr. (December 15, 1925 – May 29, 2017) was a Filipino basketball player who competed in the 1948, 1952 and 1956 Summer Olympics.

Campos was born in Iloilo City and started to play basketball at the age of 15. In 1941, he was a member of the junior team of De La Salle College in the NCAA. Campos went to the University of Santo Tomas and played for the Goldies in the UAAP in 1946 and led the team to the varsity championship and in the National Open. Campos had his personal best of 52 points, which he scored when he was playing for the famed Sampaguita Pictures quintet made up of only eight players. His colorful career on the hardcourt also includes seven years with the YCO Painters during the 1950s. Campos retired from major competition in 1958.

References

External links
 

1925 births
2017 deaths
Olympic basketball players of the Philippines
UST Growling Tigers basketball players
Basketball players at the 1948 Summer Olympics
Basketball players at the 1952 Summer Olympics
Basketball players at the 1956 Summer Olympics
Philippines men's national basketball team players
Filipino men's basketball players
De La Salle University alumni
Sportspeople from Iloilo City
Basketball players from Iloilo